Teylan is a village in Pashtun Kot District in the Faryab Province, in northern Afghanistan.

References

Populated places in Faryab Province